Nakhon Sawan Football Club is a Thai semi-professional football club based in Nakhon Sawan province. The club currently plays in the Thai League 4 Northern Region.

Nakon Sawan have won the now defunct Provincial League twice in 2001 and 2003.

History
Nakhon Sawan F.C. was founded in 1999. In the year 2000, the club played in the Thailand Provincial League. The club then succeeded as winning the championship in 2001 and 2003 season. However, the profits were not of great value because the champion of this league was not officially recognized as a champion of Thailand. After the inclusion of the Provincial League in 2007, in the league system of the Thai Football Association, the club played in the Thailand Division 1 League. In the first year of the club even reached seventh place in the group, stood in 15th place with one year later on the relegation zone.

At the beginning of the 2009 season, Bangkok Bank FC withdrew from the league before the season began. FAT therefore decided that to fill the league with 16 teams, they would run a pre-season competition featuring the 4 relegated clubs from the Thailand Division 1 League 2008 season. Nakhon was one of these clubs. Nakhon then went on to the play-off final where they lost 4–0 to Thai Honda FC and would have to start the 2009 season in Division 2.

Further to the 2009 league season, Nakhon Sawan were allowed to enter the first Division due to the withdrawal of the Army Welfare Department side that were promoted from Division 2 in the previous season.

The Red Lions finished sixth in 2010 Thai Division 2 League Northern Region.

Honours

Domestic leagues

Provincial League
 Winners (2) : 2001, 2003

Stadium and locations

Season by season record

Players

Current squad

External links
 Official Website
 Official Facebookpage

Football clubs in Thailand
Association football clubs established in 1999
Nakhon Sawan province
1999 establishments in Thailand